Rasta Revolution is a compilation album by Bob Marley and the Wailers released by Trojan in 1974. It consists of most of Soul Rebels, as well as the 7" version of "Duppy Conqueror", recorded during the album's sessions (although an alternate version appeared on Soul Revolution Part II instead), and "Mr. Brown", an alternate version of the former.

Track listing
Side one
"Mr. Brown" - 3:33
"Soul Rebel" - 3:19
"Try Me" - 2:47
"It's Alright" - 2:36
"No Sympathy" - 2:13
"My Cup" - 3:37
"Duppy Conqueror" - 3:46

Side two
"Rebel's Hop" - 2:40
"Corner Stone" - 2:30
"400 Years" - 2:34
"No Water" - 2:10
"Reaction" - 2:42
"Soul Almighty" - 2:43

Current CD Version
"Mr. Brown" - 3:33
"Soul Rebel" - 3:19
"Try Me" - 2:47
"It's Alright" - 2:36
"No Sympathy" - 2:13
"My Cup" - 3:37
"Duppy Conqueror" - 3:46
"Rebel's Hop" - 2:37
"Corner Stone" - 2:30
"400 Years" - 2:34
"No Water" - 2:10
"Reaction" - 2:42
"Soul Almighty" - 2:43

1974 compilation albums
Bob Marley and the Wailers compilation albums
Albums produced by Lee "Scratch" Perry
Trojan Records albums